Sutlepa Sea (Estonian Sutlepa meri) is a lake in Estonia.

See also
Sutlepa

Lakes of Estonia
Lääne-Nigula Parish
Landforms of Lääne County